Niall MacDermot CBE OBE QC (10 September 1916 – 22 February 1996) was a British Labour politician.

MacDermot was educated at Rugby School and Corpus Christi College, Cambridge, and served in the Intelligence Corps during the Second World War. He was first elected to the House of Commons as Member of Parliament (MP) for Lewisham North, at a by-election in 1957 following the death of Conservative MP Sir Austin Hudson.

MacDermot lost his seat two years later at the 1959 general election, and unsuccessfully contested the equivalent seat at the 1961 London County Council election.  He returned to Parliament as MP for Derby North at a by-election in 1962.

He was Financial Secretary to the Treasury from 1964 to 1967, and retired from the Commons at the 1970 general election.

From 1970 to 1990, he was Secretary-General of the International Commission of Jurists, succeeding Seán MacBride.

He was the grandson of Hugh Hyacinth O'Rorke MacDermot, who served as Solicitor General for Ireland in 1885 and 1886, and as Attorney General for Ireland in 1892. He was also the nephew of Frank MacDermot a Fine Gael politician.

Notes

References

External links 
 

1916 births
1996 deaths
British people of Irish descent
Financial Secretary to the Treasury
Intelligence Corps officers
Labour Party (UK) MPs for English constituencies
Members of the Parliament of the United Kingdom for constituencies in Derbyshire
Alumni of Corpus Christi College, Cambridge
People educated at Rugby School
Commanders of the Order of the British Empire
20th-century King's Counsel
UK MPs 1955–1959
UK MPs 1959–1964
UK MPs 1964–1966
UK MPs 1966–1970
MacDermot family
Ministers in the Wilson governments, 1964–1970